Cours-les-Barres is a commune in the Cher department in the Centre-Val de Loire region of France.

Geography

Population

Sights
 The fifteenth-century church of St. Pantaléon.
 The manorhouse at Givry.
 A feudal motte.

See also
Communes of the Cher department

References

Communes of Cher (department)